May Chan Ka-kai (born 29 May 1985) is a Hong Kong television actress currently under Television Broadcasts Limited (TVB) management. Chan also goes by her nickname Siu Po (小寶), which means "small treasure" or "precious" in Chinese. Chan has a plus-size physique and is often cast in comedic roles as a gluttonous girl or the girl trying to get a guy. She first gained recognition playing the role "Mo Siu-man (毛小曼)" in TVB's 2013 drama "Inbound Troubles 老表，你好嘢！".

Biography
May Chan was born on May 29, 1985 in Shanghai, China. She is an only child. At the age of two, she and her family emigrated to Hong Kong. Chan has a teaching certificate in piano; as she was not very good academically, her mother suggested she take up an instrument when she was 11 years old. She used her skills in piano to earn a living part-time as a piano teacher during her college years. Chan has had weight issue her entire life; this was due to uncontrollable excessive eating. Exceeding over 200 pounds, she had spent a summer on a strict diet slimming down to 140 pounds, but ended up gaining the weight back.

Career
Previously Chan worked a regular office desk job in Kwun Tong, Kowloon. In 2009 she had a very minor role in the film "Short of Love 矮仔多情", During filming she became acquainted with the lead actor Wong Cho-lam and the two kept in touch. Chan spent the next few years continuing acting part-time playing minor roles in films and TVB dramas. Wong later recommended Chan to TVB producer Wong Wai Sing when casting for Inbound Troubles, which Wong was also a writer. Chan character "Little Tiny" Mo Siu-man, cute and cheerful personality in the drama was well received which lead to her first acting award nomination. She was nominated in the best supporting actress category at the 2013 TVB Awards Presentation and soon TVB offered her more acting roles.

Chan had a small role in Dayo Wong's 2013 drama Bounty Lady, though she only appeared in a few episodes starring in the role Judy Ha Ming Chu, a village chief daughter looking for a man, it was enough for her to stand out with audiences praising her comedic acting.

Chan collaborated with Wong Cho-lam again in 2014 when he took over the production of Gilded Chopsticks . She was cast in a supporting role playing Siu To, the personal maid of Nancy Wu's character Nin Yeuk-bik, the role was enough for her in gaining more exposure to TVB audiences. Also later that year Chan participated in the direct sequel to Inbound Troubles, Come On, Cousin. which Wong Cho-lam is also a writer. Chan played Viviene Chow Lai Man, a masseuse who also works as a supermarket cashier.

Personal life
She is close friends with Wong Cho-lam. She is usually cast in projects he produces.

Due to her weight issue, Chan stated that into her adult years, she has never dated.

Chan has vowed to remain a virgin until she is married.

Chan's first ever kiss on the lips with a male was given to her Come On, Cousin co-star Bob Lam since the two played a couple in the drama.

Filmography

Television dramas

Films

Music Video Appearances

Publications

* 21 July 2013 : Little Tiny, You Are Good (細細粒，你好嘢) -  - Author: May Chan 陳嘉佳 (Siu Po 小寶) - Publisher: Open Book Net Publishing 青春文化 
A self written autobiography, Chan details her life as a Hong Kong artiste, her early years and the prejudice she often faces for being plus-size. The title of the book is in reference of drama Inbound Troubles Chinese title and her character Mo Siu-man, her breakout role.

Awards and nominations

References

External links
 Siu Po Official facebook page 
 May Chan Official weibo page
 
 May Chan hkmdb page

Hong Kong television actresses
1985 births
Living people
21st-century Hong Kong actresses
Hong Kong television personalities